Roy Byford (12 January 1873 – 31 January 1939) was a British actor.

Selected filmography
 The Little Damozel (1916)
 On the Banks of Allan Water (1916)
 The Happy Warrior (1917)
 The Twelve Pound Look (1920)
 The Double Event (1921)
 The Night Hawk (1921)
 Love's Boomerang (1922)
 The Spanish Jade (1922)
 A Master of Craft (1922)
 Tons of Money (1924)
 Immortal Gentleman (1935)
 Museum Mystery (1937)

References

External links

Roy Byford at Find A Grave

1873 births
1939 deaths
English male stage actors
English male film actors
English male silent film actors
Male actors from London
20th-century English male actors